Urmston Road (Chinese: 龍鼓水道, literally 'Dragon Drum Channel', also named as 暗士頓水道) is a broad body of water between Lantau Island and Tuen Mun in Hong Kong.  It forms an inshore passage between the northwest end of Victoria Harbour and the mouth of the Pearl River.  At its eastern end it connects to the Western Working Anchorage through the Ma Wan Channel and the narrower Kap Shui Mun channel to the west of Ma Wan.

History
Urmston Road is named after Sir James Brabazon Urmston, who was the British East India Company's China chief from 1819 to 1826. The passage received its English name in 1823; prior to that it was referred to as Toon-Koo Bay.

Geography
Urmston Road contains a number of small islands and rocks, which confine the main shipping fairway to a relatively narrow course along the north side.  It is occasionally used as an alternative route for the ferry service between Hong Kong and Macau in times of heavy weather from the south.  There are several piers, shipping terminals and anchorages around Urmston Road, including the Tuen Mun River Trade Terminal.  First Ferry operates a passenger ferry service across Urmston Road from Tuen Mun to Tung Chung.

The most significant recent development in the area was the building in the 1990s of the new Hong Kong International Airport, almost entirely on reclaimed land around a rocky islet called Chek Lap Kok close to the north of Lantau.

See also
 List of channels in Hong Kong
 Sha Chau
 Lung Kwu Chau
 The Brothers (islands), Hong Kong
 Tuen Mun–Chek Lap Kok Link

References

Channels of Hong Kong